Magna Home Entertainment was an independent home entertainment distributor headquartered in Brisbane, Queensland, Australia, operating within Australia and New Zealand. As of February 2009, Magna Home Entertainment became a fully owned subsidiary of Beyond International (ASX:BYI), an Australian television production and distribution company. Magna Home Entertainment is the sister company of Melbourne-based home entertainment distributor Beyond Home Entertainment, also a subsidiary of Beyond International. Magna Home Entertainment distributes television series, documentaries and feature films.

Company history
The company was incorporated in 1983. Principal activities of the company in the 1980s included the import and wholesale distribution of video cassettes, audio cassettes, micro cassettes, and computer equipment. In 1990, the company was publicly listed as Magna Pacific (Holdings) Ltd. During the 1990s, the company expanded its activities into intellectual property licensing, acquiring videogram home entertainment distribution rights for a number of licensed properties. Rapid growth in the late 1990s and early 2000s saw Magna listed in Business Review Weekly's Fast 100 List, as the company expanded its distribution and acquired several key licensed properties that ensured strong growth in home entertainment revenue. Magna followed the industry migration to DVD media during this period, and now releases home entertainment content via DVD, Blu-ray, and digital-file-based distribution. Magna Pacific is a budget distributor known for producing bare-bones media without extras or subtitles.

Distribution facility
Magna Home Entertainment's headquarters in Eagle Farm, Brisbane, Queensland includes a distribution facility. It opened in July 2006.

Titles distributed

Magna Home Entertainment is a home entertainment distributor for children's brands, television series, documentaries, and feature films.

Children's series
Archibald the Koala
The Avengers: Earth's Mightiest Heroes
The Adventures of Blinky Bill
Bananaman
Berenstain Bears
Beyblade V-Force
Bigfoot Presents: Meteor and the Mighty Monster Trucks
Blazing Dragons
Bolts & Blip
Bratz
Care Bears
Chaotic
Code Lyoko
Corduroy
Corneil and Bernie
Crush Gear
Cubix
Dennis the Menace
Dinosaur King
Dog City
Donkey Kong Country
Dumb Bunnies
The Elephant Princess
The Fairly OddParents
Fantastic Four: World's Greatest Heroes
Fly Tales
Fraggle Rock
Franklin
George and Martha
H2O: Just Add Water
Hamtaro
Harry and His Bucket Full of Dinosaurs
Holly Hobbie and Friends
Inspector Gadget
Jibber Jabber
Kenny The Shark
Larry the Lawnmower
Little Charlie Bear
Little People
Marvel Knights Motion Comics
Megaman NT Warrior
Moville Mysteries
My Little Pony
The Neverending Story
Percy the Park Keeper
Pet Alien
Pigeon Boy
Pingu
Pippi Longstocking
Pokémon
Roary the Racing Car
Rollbots
Round The Twist
Rupert
Sabrina: The Animated Series
SD Gundam Force
Seaside Hotel
Sheeep
Shinchan
Skippy: Adventures in Bushtown
Smurfs
Strawberry Shortcake
The Super Hero Squad Show
Teenage Mutant Ninja Turtles
The Three Friends and Jerry
Totally Spies!
 Tractor Tom
Tutenstein
The Upside Down Show
Viva Piñata
Winx Club
Wolverine and the X-Men
Yu-Gi-Oh!
Yu-Gi-Oh! GX
Zoids: Chaotic Century
Zoids: Fuzors
Zoids: New Century

Television series
American Chopper
American Hot Rod
Deadliest Catch
Cake Boss
Dirty Jobs
LA Ink
Man Vs Wild
Miami Ink
Overhaulin'
The Cosby Show
Roseanne
Dog the Bounty Hunter
Gene Simmons Family Jewels
Wire In The Blood
River Monsters
Trailer Park Boys
Wire in the Blood

Documentaries
Discovery Channel
History Channel
Biography Channel
The Crocodile Hunter

Feature films
Dot Goes to Hollywood (1987)
Four Weddings and a Funeral (1994)
Scream (1996)
Dances with Wolves (1990)
FairyTale: A True Story (1997)
Just Friends
Because I Said So
Bratz: The Movie
August Rush
Penelope
Over Her Dead Body
Chaos Theory
The Accidental Husband
The Mutant Chronicles
Righteous Kill
Hong Kong Legends

See also

Beyond Television Productions
List of companies of Australia

References

External links
Beyond Home Entertainment website
Beyond International website

Companies based in Brisbane
Entertainment companies established in 1983
Home video companies of Australia